The following works deal with the cultural, political, economic, military, biographical and geologic history of pre-territorial South Dakota, the southern part of Dakota Territory and the State of South Dakota.

Bibliographies
  Recommended by the South Dakota State Archives.

General histories
South Dakota Magazine. This general-interest magazine covers history, art, and current events of South Dakota.

Hoover, Herbert T., and Harry F. Thompson. A new South Dakota history (Center for Western Studies, 2005)
 From the publisher of South Dakota Magazine, with many photographs.

  complete text online; 900 pages of scholarly articles

Doane Robinson
Doane Robinson was a state historian of South Dakota and the author of several important works on the state's history through the first decade of the 1900s.

American Indian history

Gold rush and Plains Wars

Homesteading and agricultural settlement years

Economic history

Local studies
 
 Harrison, Fraser. Infinite West: Travels in South Dakota (2013) Excerpt
 Miller, John E. Miller. Laura Ingalls Wilder's Little Town: Where History and Literature Meet (1994) excerpt
 Parker, Watson. Deadwood: The Golden Years (1981) excerpt
 Schwieder, Dorothy Hubbard. Growing Up with the Town: Family and Community on the Great Plains (University of Iowa Press, 2002); family life in the town of Presho, 1880s-1930s
  -  online edition

Geology
  (describes the exploration of Jewel Cave National Monument from its discovery to the mid-1980s)

Political history
 Blackorby Edward. Prairie Rebel: The Public Life of William Lemke (University of Nebraska Press, 1955)
 Carlson Paul, and Steve Porter. "South Dakota Congressmen and the Hundred Days of the New Deal". South Dakota History vol, 8, no. 4 (Fall 1978): 327-39.
 Easton Patricia O'Keefe. "Women's Suffrage in South Dakota: The Final Decade, 1911–1920". South Dakota History vol 13 (1983): 206–26.
 Garry, Patrick M., and Candice Spurlin. "History of the 1889 South Dakota Constitution." South Dakota Law Review 59 (2014): 14+.
 Lamar Howard. Dakota Territory, 1861–1899: A Study in Frontier Politics (Yale University Press, 1956)
 
 
 Maier, Chris. "The Farmers' Fight for Representation: Third-Party Politics in South Dakota, 1889–1918." Great Plains Quarterly (2014) 34#2 pp: 143-162.
 Miller, John E., “Defining Moments in Twentieth-century South Dakota Political History,” South Dakota History, 42 (Summer 2012), 168–90.

Biographies
 
 
  Autobiography of life in northwestern South Dakota.

Societies, organizations, and collections
 
 
 
  1950s-present.
  1882-present.

See also

 Bibliography of the Lewis and Clark Expedition
 Bibliography of Montana history
 Bibliography of Wyoming history
 Bibliography of North Dakota history
 Bibliography of Minnesota history
 Bibliography of Nebraska history

Notes

History of South Dakota
Bibliographies of the United States and territories
Bibliographies of history